Acyclania tenebrosa is a moth of the family Noctuidae first described by Paul Dognin in 1911. It is found in Argentina; it was historically misclassified, but in 2010 was determined to belong to the subfamily Agaristinae.

References

Agaristinae
Moths described in 1911